Turpitude, meaning baseness or depravity, can refer specifically to:
Moral turpitude, a legal concept in the United States
Gnostical turpitude, the crime of the protagonist in Vladimir Nabokov's Invitation to a Beheading
Turpitude Design, a computer game design firm started by American game designer Stieg Hedlund